The All-Ireland Senior B Hurling Championship of 1984 was the 11th staging of Ireland's secondary hurling knock-out competition.  Westmeath won the centenary year championship, beating London 4–10 to 1–16 in the final at the Emerald GAA Grounds, Ruislip.

References

 Donegan, Des, The Complete Handbook of Gaelic Games (DBA Publications Limited, 2005).

1984
B